A women's One Day International (WODI) is an international cricket match between two teams, each having WODI status, as determined by the International Cricket Council (ICC). In a WODI match, the two teams play a single innings, each of which is restricted to a maximum of 50 overs. The first WODI matches were played as part of the 1973 Women's Cricket World Cup held in England, two years after the first men's One Day International was contested between Australia and England in January 1971. A five-wicket haul (also known as a "five-for" or "fifer") refers to a bowler taking five or more wickets in a single innings. This is regarded as a notable achievement. The first two five-wicket hauls in WODIs were taken on 23 June 1973, as part of the Women's World Cup. Australia's Tina Macpherson and New Zealand's Glenys Page both achieved the feat as part of their teams' victories over Young England and Trinidad and Tobago respectively. Macpherson and Page are two of only five players to take a five-wicket haul during their WODI debut, the others being India's Purnima Choudhary, Laura Harper of England and Felicity Leydon-Davis from New Zealand.

Suthershini Sivanantham has taken the most economical five-wicket haul with an economy rate of just 0.21. Bowling for Sri Lanka, she took five wickets for just two runs against Pakistan at Moors Sports Club Ground in Colombo in January 2002. The least economical five-wicket haul was taken by South Africa's Suné Luus with an economy rate of 6.70. Despite Luus taking figures of 5 wickets for 67 runs (5/67) off her 10 overs at the County Ground in Taunton during the 2017 Women's Cricket World Cup, South Africa lost the match to Australia – one of only thirteen occurrences that did not result in a victory to the team taking the five-wicket haul. There have been two occasions where two five-wicket hauls have been taken in the same match. The first was during the 2005 Women's Cricket World Cup in South Africa. India's Neetu David took figures of 5/32 in the first innings with Louise Milliken of New Zealand taking 5/25 to lead her side to victory. The other was during the 2007 Women's European Cricket Championship in Deventer where Annemarie Tanke of the Netherlands finished with 5/40. In reply, Ciara Metcalfe returned career best figures of 5/18 to help steer Ireland to victory.

Anisa Mohammed of the West Indies tops the list as the only bowler to have achieved the feat six times. She is followed by Katherine Brunt of England and South Africa's Suné Luus with five five-wicket hauls, Australian Cathryn Fitzpatrick with four and New Zealand's Holly Huddleston and Ellyse Perry of Australia with three. Fitzpatrick is also the oldest player to achieve to take a fifer, taking her final five-wicket haul seven days short of her 38th birthday. Five bowlers have taken a seven-wicket haul in a WODI, with Pakistan's Sajjida Shah returning the best figures in the format with seven wickets for just four runs. Playing in the 2003 IWCC Trophy against Japan in their debut WODI match, Shah is also the youngest bowler, aged just 15 years and 168 days, to take five wickets in an innings. The other four to take seven wickets in an innings are Jo Chamberlain of England who took 7/8 against Denmark during the 1991 European Women's Cricket Championship; Mohammed who took 7/14 in a player of the match performance to help the West Indies win the final of the 2011 Women's Cricket World Cup Qualifier tournament against Pakistan, Perry who took 7/22 in the third WODI against England during the 2019 Women's Ashes series and Australia's Shelley Nitschke who finished with 7/24 during the 2005 Women's Ashes series. A further twelve players have taken a six-wicket haul.

, 122 five-wicket hauls have been taken by 83 different players from over 1,301 WODI matches. England lead the list with 24 five-wicket hauls, followed by New Zealand with 22 and Australia with 20. Bert Sutcliffe Oval in Lincoln, New Zealand, leads the list of where the most five-wicket hauls have been taken with nine, ahead of the Derby County Cricket Ground and Grace Road with four each.

Key

Five-wicket hauls

Notes

References

Women's
Women's
!